The Women's U17 European Volleyball Championship is a sport competition for volleyball national teams with players under 17 years, currently held biannually and organized by the European Volleyball Confederation, the volleyball federation from Europe. As of the 2023 edition, the CEV aligned the age limit for the men's and women's competitions to U17. For the first three editions of the tournament age limit for women's competition was U16.

Results summary

Medal table

Participating nations

References

External links

Competition History

Girls U16
Volleyball
 
European volleyball records and statistics